Statistics of the Scottish Football League in season 1965–66.

Scottish League Division One

Scottish League Division Two

See also
1965–66 in Scottish football

References

 
Scottish Football League seasons